The Ballon d'Or Dream Team is an all-time all-star team published by France Football on the 14th of December 2020 after conducting an internet poll of fans to select a football dream team starting from October 2020. The final team was selected by 140 France Football correspondents around the world. A second and a third team were also published.

Nominations
The nominations were announced from 5 October 2020 through 19 October 2020. The winners were revealed on 14 December 2020 and lined up in a 3–4–3 formation. Brazil was the country with the highest number of nominated players (20 athletes), ahead of Italy (16), Germany (13), Netherlands (12), Spain (8), England and France (7).

The nominations for the goalkeepers were announced on 5 October 2020.

Right-backs

The nominations for the right-backs were announced on 5 October 2020.

Centre-backs
The nominations for the centre-backs were announced on 5 October 2020.

Left-backs
The nominations for the left-backs were announced on 5 October 2020.

Defensive midfielders/Centre midfielders
The nominations for the defensive midfielders were announced on 12 October 2020.

Offensive midfielders
The nominations for the offensive midfielders were announced on 12 October 2020.

Right wingers
The nominations for the right wingers were announced on 19 October 2020.

Centre-forwards
The nominations for the center-forwards were announced on 19 October 2020.

Left wingers
The nominations for the left wingers were announced on 19 October 2020.

Selected teams

First Team

Second Team

Third Team

Notes

References